The Hong Kong Disneyland Railroad is a  narrow gauge rail transport attraction in Hong Kong Disneyland, which opened on September 12, 2005, the same day the park opened.

Ride experience
Main Street Station is the first station seen upon entering Hong Kong Disneyland in Main Street, U.S.A. From there, guests can start their journey around the park, with a recorded narration commenting on visited landscapes.

Just right after the train departs Main Street Station, the train travels through Adventureland and the rivers of the Jungle River Cruise. After passing through the jungle, the train arrives in Fantasyland and makes a stop at Fantasyland Station. Passengers who wish to visit this land may disembark at this station.

After dropping off and picking up passengers, the train then departs Fantasyland Station. Upon departure, passengers are able to see the Fantasy Gardens, Mad Hatter Tea Cups, and the walkway to It's a Small World. The train also travels underneath the queue line of Mickey and the Wondrous Book.

The train then leaves Fantasyland and passes through Tomorrowland, where passengers can see Space Mountain (currently themed as Star Wars: Hyperspace Mountain), along with other attractions in the area. It also passes through the showbuilding of Ant-Man and The Wasp: Nano Battle!.

After passing through Tomorrowland, the train finally arrives back at Main Street Station, bringing the journey around the park to a finish.

During peak traffic periods, the railroad offers only one-way trips where all passengers must disembark at the Fantasyland Station and re-board for the return trip to Main Street, U.S.A. (and vice versa).

Rolling stock

The Hong Kong Disneyland Railroad operates three 4-4-0 steam-outline locomotives built by Severn Lamb, which were named after past Walt Disney Company presidents. There are also two sets of train cars, each consisting of five coaches with a total seating capacity of 250 people per train.

Unlike other railroads at Disneyland-style parks, where the trains are powered by actual steam locomotives, Hong Kong Disneyland's trains are powered by steam-outline locomotives, which are diesel locomotives with the outward appearance of steam locomotives. This is due to Hong Kong's strict emissions standards, which also served as a cost-effective measure which obviated the need to build new steam locomotives, or the finding and transport to Hong Kong of suitable existing narrow gauge steam locomotives. As a result, in order to mimic the sound of an actual steam locomotive, typical steam audio (chuffing, steam whistle, etc.) are emitted from a set of hidden speakers installed on each locomotive. Despite the fact that they are not steam-powered, Dana Amendola, the author of All Aboard: The Wonderful World of Disney Trains, describes the locomotives as "a representation of the golden age of railroading."

See also

Rail transport in Walt Disney Parks and Resorts
 Track gauge in Hong Kong

References

Bibliography

External links

2005 establishments in Hong Kong
Amusement rides introduced in 2005
Heritage railways in Hong Kong
Hong Kong Disneyland
Narrow gauge railways in Hong Kong
Rail transport in Walt Disney Parks and Resorts
Railways of amusement parks in Hong Kong
Walt Disney Parks and Resorts attractions
Western (genre) amusement rides